The women's doubles event at the 2018 Mediterranean Games was held from 26 to 29 June at the Tarragona Tennis Club.

Başak Eraydın and İpek Öz of Turkey won the gold medal, defeating Nefisa Berberović and Dea Herdželaš of Bosnia and Herzegovina in the final, 0–6, 6–3, [12–10].

Marina Bassols Ribera and Eva Guerrero Álvarez of Spain won the bronze medal, defeating Fiona Ferro and Harmony Tan of France in the bronze medal match, 7–5, 7–5.

Medalists

Seeds
  (semifinals; fourth place)
  (champions; gold medalists)
  (final; silver medalists)
  (semifinals; bronze medalists)

Draw

Draw

References

External links
 Draw

Tennis at the 2018 Mediterranean Games